Braithwaite is an unincorporated community in Plaquemines Parish, Louisiana, United States. Braithwaite has a post office with ZIP code 70040, which opened on September 19, 1902. Two of the first deaths in the United States caused by Hurricane Isaac in 2012 occurred in Braithwaite, where a couple drowned in their home on August 30.

Education
Plaquemines Parish School Board operates public schools serving the community. The K-12 school Phoenix High School is in Braithwaite.

See also
Mary Plantation House
Orange Grove Plantation House
Promised Land

References

Unincorporated communities in Plaquemines Parish, Louisiana
Unincorporated communities in Louisiana
Louisiana populated places on the Mississippi River
Unincorporated communities in New Orleans metropolitan area